Abony is a railway station of the Hungarian State Railways (MÁV) in Abony, Hungary.

Passin train line(s)
 Budapest–Cegléd–Szolnok railway (Line 100A)

Transport
 Bus (long-distance): 535

Train services
The station is served by the following services:

Distance from other railway stations
 Budapest -Nyugati: 89 km
 Kőbánya-Kispest: 78 km
 Albertirsa: 34 km
 Cegléd: 16 km 
 Szolnok: 11 km
 Püspökladány: 107 km
 Debrecen: 132 km
 Nyíregyháza: 181 km

See also 

History of rail transport in Hungary
Rail transport in Hungary

References

External links 
Abony railway station – vasutallomasok.hu 

Railway stations in Hungary
Railway stations opened in 1847

Railway stations in Hungary opened in 1847